Gipsy Hill in south London is a hilly and leafy neighbourhood spanning the southern parts of the London Boroughs of Lambeth and Southwark characterised for its stunning views of the City of London and Dulwich.  

It borders the neighbourhood of Crystal Palace, which was crowned as the best place to live in London by the Sunday Times Best Place to Live survey. 

Historically, north of its traditional Westow-Central Hill southern limit, it was split between the southern projections of the West Norwood daughter parish of Lambeth and the St Giles church daughter parish of Camberwell in Surrey until urban reforms of 1889 created the County of London. It takes in, due to a diagonal, slightly weaving border, somewhat less of the London Borough of Southwark, and it has a ridge-top border along the retail/services/leisure street Westow Hill and residential street Central Hill with Upper Norwood in the London Borough of Croydon.

History and Geography
Gipsy Hill is the name of the central road that runs south upwards from Gipsy Road, where it becomes Alleyn Park near the southern end of Croxted Road, up to Central Hill and Westow Hill (a brief eastern continuation in the Crystal Palace Triangle). The latter are two crest-top roads marking the limit of Upper Norwood, part of the London Borough (and, here, former parish) of Croydon. Due to its station, as common across London, the name has been taken to extend to encompass a wider, in this case, upper hill-side zone in extreme projections of the two relevant boroughs. It takes its name from the presence of Gypsies in what was, until the 19th century, sparsely populated rurality. On 11 August 1668, Samuel Pepys recorded in his diary that his wife had visited "the gypsies at Lambeth"; Keats also wrote about the Norwood gypsies. The area's name derives from the Roma Gypsies who settled in the area during the 1600-1800s. 

At the east and west ends of the hill which descends more gently north, are the forked sources of the former River Effra.

The hill and particularly its southern climactic ridge are part of a much larger formation, the Norwood Ridge.

The area rapidly developed after Gipsy Hill railway station was opened in 1856, with large houses being constructed (most now subdivided) and blocks of council-built housing in the mid-20th century, a little remaining as assisted (Social) housing. An 18-room nuclear bunker was constructed between 1963 and 1966 as part of a block of flats on the Central Hill Estate called Pear Tree House on Lunham Road.

Politics
For the west, Gipsy Hill ward is represented by three elected members of Lambeth Borough Council (green and Labour); for fair apportionment it extends into West Norwood and West Dulwich.  For the east, since 2018, two members represent Dulwich Wood ward on Southwark Council, which similarly extends into the Sydenham Hill area of what is traditionally Dulwich.

Buildings and facilities

The Central Hill Estate was built in the 1960s-70s designed by Rosemary Stjernstedt, Roger Westman and the Lambeth Council planning department during the directorship of Ted Hollamby.

Police
Gipsy Hill Police Station was on the A214, Central Hill, the western continuation of Westow Hill. It was London's highest station, an old Bench Mark SW, opposite, stated  Above Ordnance Datum.

Pubs and independent breweries
Three of the pubs are central on the street Gipsy Hill: The Colby Arms, The Bull and Finch and The Great Southern. Higher but before Westow Hill, The Railway Bell is on Cawnpore Street, a side street. The Two Towers and Paxton are on the relatively low, north-west Gipsy Road.

Two independent companies brew beer commercially: the Gipsy Hill Brewing Co. and the London Beer Factory.

Schools
Elm Wood Primary School, Carnac Street. 
Kingswood Primary School, Gipsy Road (on two sites).
Park Campus Academy, Gipsy Road. 
Paxton Primary School, Woodland Road.

Elm Wood, Kingswood and Paxton schools are all members of The Gipsy Hill Federation.

The nearest private school is in West Dulwich.

Churches
The following congregations meet in buildings that are readily identified as places of worship:
 Berridge Road Community Church (Anglican), Berridge Road, SE19 1EF
 Christ Church, Gipsy Hill (Anglican), 1b Highland Road SE19 1DP
 Kingdom Hall of Jehovah's Witnesses, Whiteley Road, SE19 1JT
 Upper Norwood Methodist Church, Westow Hill, SE19 1TQ

These buildings were constructed as places of worship but are now used for other purposes:
 Former Gipsy Hill Wesleyan Chapel; converted into flats. 
 Former Gipsy Road Baptist Church; upper part: housing conversion; ground floor: nursery.
 The tower of Christ Church, Gipsy Hill; converted in to a house following a fire in the nineteen-eighties.

Nearest places

 Crystal Palace
 Dulwich Wood
 Herne Hill
 Sydenham
 Upper Norwood
 West Dulwich
 West Norwood

Nearest stations
Crystal Palace railway station
Gipsy Hill railway station
West Norwood railway station
Sydenham Hill railway station

Notable residents

Errol Brown of Hot Chocolate, lived in Alexandra Drive, Gipsy Hill
Christopher Noulton, Artist, Television producer, director, writer, production designer, and special effects model maker. Made the models for the first series of Thomas the Tank Engine and Friends, and had his own television show called Potamus Park on ITV in the 1990s. Lived on the Charters Close council estate. 
Daniel Kitson, comedian, known for Phoenix Nights
Kate Thornton, former presenter of The X Factor
Nathaniel Chalobah, Watford football player
 Trevoh Chalobah, Chelsea football player
Martin Orbell, sound engineer for The Boomtown Rats and the Sex Pistols
Nigel Eaton, hurdy gurdy player for Jimmy Page, Robert Plant, Scott Walker, Tony Ferrino
Krept & Konan, rappers
Isy Suttie, actress, radio presenter and comedian
Elis James, comedian, broadcaster and actor
Patrick Grant, designer and judge on The Great British Sewing Bee
K-Trap, rapper
Hard Skin, local oi band, have many songs about Gipsy Hill
Caleb Azumah Nelson, author

References

External links
Virtual Norwood
Pear Tree House - London SE Group War HQ (Control 51C)

Districts of the London Borough of Lambeth
Areas of London
Streets in the London Borough of Lambeth